Brick Bradford is a science fiction comic strip created by writer William Ritt, a journalist based in Cleveland, and artist Clarence Gray. It was first distributed on August 21, 1933 by Central Press Association, a subsidiary of King Features Syndicate which specialized in producing material for small-town newspapers. The strip ended in 1987.

Brick Bradford achieved its greatest popularity outside the United States. The series was carried by both newspapers and comic books in Australia and New Zealand.  In France the strip was known as Luc Bradefer ("Luke Ironarm") and was published in many newspapers. The strip was also widely published in Italy where it was known variously as Giorgio Ventura and Marco Spada and in Greece in the newspaper Ethnos (as Princess Palona) during the 1960s.

Publication history 
Ritt grew tired of Brick Bradford in the mid-1940s, and by 1948 he had turned over first the daily and then the Sunday to Gray, who did the strip by himself until his health problems increased. In 1952, Paul Norris (who had been working on King's Jungle Jim) took over the daily. When Gray died in 1956, Norris took over the Sunday strip. Norris retired in 1987, and the strip was retired as well with the daily ending April 25, 1987, and the Sundays two weeks later.

Characters and story
Brick Bradford was an athletic and adventurous redheaded (later blond) aviator from Kentucky who continually encountered fantastic situations. Initially, the strip was focused on Earth-bound, aviation-focused adventures, in a similar manner to Lester J. Maitland and Dick Calkins' Skyroads. However, as the strip developed, Brick Bradford increasingly featured fantastic elements in the manner of Buck Rogers and Flash Gordon. Ritt was an admirer of science fiction writers H. G. Wells, Edgar Rice Burroughs and Abraham Merritt, and drew on some of their ideas when writing Brick Bradford. Brick Bradford now became more of a space opera/adventure story, with its tales of dinosaurs, lost civilizations, intergalactic villains, robots and subatomic worlds.

By 1935, Brick Bradford'''s popularity had greatly increased, and it arrived in the Sunday comics sections of major newspapers in 1933, followed by a weekend edition that began November 24, 1934. In the daily strips Brick kept company with his friend Sandy Sanderson, balding and bearded scientist Kalla Kopak, and June Salisbury, Brick's girlfriend and daughter of his ally Professor Van Atta Salisbury.  The Sunday strips featured completely different characters and plots. Here Brick was often accompanied on his adventures by Professor Horatio Southern and his daughter April, who was Brick's love interest . Later characters included Brick's pugnacious sidekick Bucko O'Brien and the beautiful, black-haired bad girl Saturn Sadie who reformed and in the end married the stalwart hero.

Brick's enemies included Dr. Franz Ego, a spy; Avil Blue, inventor of a giant robot; and the "Assassins", descendants of the Middle Eastern sect of the same name.

On April 20, 1935, the strip added a large top-shaped time machine invented by Professor Southern called, fittingly, the Time Top which could travel to both past and future and off into the depths of space, presaging Doc Wonmug's device in Alley Oop four years later and the TARDIS on Doctor Who by almost three decades.

Daily strips by Clarence Gray and William Ritt
 D001 In the City Beneath the Sea (08/21/1933 – 06/30/1934) 270 strips
 D002 With Brocco the Buccaneer (07/02/1934 – 05/18/1935) 276 strips
 D003 On the Isles Beyond the Ice (05/20/1935 – 04/11/1936) 282 strips
 D004 Brick Bradford and the Lord of Doom (04/13/1936 – 02/06/1937) 258 strips
 D005 Adrift in an Atom [aka Voyage in a Coin] (02/08/1937 – 01/08/1938) 288 strips
 D006 In the Fortress of Fear (01/10/1938 – 02/11/1939) 342 strips
 D007 Brick Bradford and the Metal Monster (02/13/1939 – 03/16/1940) 342 strips
 D008 Brick Bradford Seeks the Diamond Doll (03/18/1940 – 12/28/1940) 246 strips
 D009 On the Throne of Titania (12/30/1940 – 06/12/1943) 768 strips
 D010 Beyond the Crystal Door (06/14/1943 – 10/21/1944) 462 strips
 D011 The Queen of the Night (10/28/1944 – 06/01/1946) 468 strips
 D012 The Witch Doctor of Wanchi (06/03/1946 – 12/07/1946) 162 strips
 D013 The Strange Case of Captain Boldd (12/09/1946 – 07/19/1947) 192 strips
 D014 Lost Train In Tunnel #10 (07/21/1947 – 05/01/1948) 246 strips
 D015 The Prophet of Thorn (05/03/1948 – 03/19/1949) 276 strips
 D016 The Colossal Fossil (03/21/1949 – 07/02/1949) 90 strips
 D017 The Island of the Eye (07/04/1949 – 12/24/1949) 150 strips
 D018 Smokeballs (12/26/1949 – 03/25/1950) 60 strips
 D019 The Howling Face (03/27/1950 – 06/17/1950) 90 strips
 D020 The Legacy of Low Lake (06/19/1950 – 10/07/1950) 96 strips
 D021 Detour of Doubt (10/09/1950 – 12/30/1950) 60 strips
 D022 Frame-Up (01/01/1951 – 03/31/1951) 90 strips
 D023 Mesa Macabre (04/02/1951 – 08/11/1951) 114 strips
 D024 Moon Maiden (08/13/1951 – 10/06/1951) 48 strips
 D025 Shadow in the Sky (10/08/1951 – 02/16/1952) 102 strips
 D026 The Six Seeds of Sibed (02/18/1952 – 05/10/1952) 96 strips
 D027 Mr. Distance (05/12/1952 – 10/18/1952) 138 strips

Daily strips by Paul Norris

 D028 Condor Corridor (10/20/1952 – 04/04/1953) 144 strips
 D029 Operation Back Burner (04/06/1953 – 07/04/1953) 78 strips
 D030 Oroto Otoro (07/06/1953 – 10/24/1953) 96 strips
 D031 Poet and Present (10/26/1953 – 01/02/1954) 60 strips
 D032 Deadline Dilemma (01/04/1954 – 05/01/1954) 102 strips
 D033 Frogman's Folly (05/03/1954 – 07/24/1954) 72 strips
 D034 Poet's Revenge (07/26/1954 – 10/09/1954) 66 strips
 D035 Honey’n’Holly (10/11/1954 – 12/04/1954) 48 strips
 D036 Temperamental Tessie (12/06/1954 – 01/29/1955) 48 strips
 D037 Found and Profound (01/31/1955 – 04/30/1955) 78 strips
 D038 Bauble's Belle (05/02/1955 – 06/25/1955) 48 strips
 D039 Silent Partners! (06/27/1955 – 10/08/1955) 90 strips
 D040 The Case of the Vicious Vines (10/10/1955 – 12/31/1955) 72 strips
 D041 Stowaway (01/02/1956 – 05/12/1956) 114 strips
 D042 Something Borrowed, Something Blue (05/14/1956 – 08/04/1956) 72 strips
 D043 Astral Assignment (08/06/1956 – 10/20/1956) 66 strips
 D044 Return of Paul Bunyan (10/22/1956 – 01/26/1957) 84 strips
 D045 The Search For Kris Kreg (01/28/1957 – 04/20/1957) 72 strips
 D046 Time-Top Trials! (04/22/1957 – 09/14/1957) 126 strips
 D047 Eye of the Needle (09/16/1957 – 11/16/1957) 54 strips
 D048 Return to Pura (11/18/1957 – 02/22/1958) 84 strips
 D049 Deep Danger (02/24/1958 – 06/07/1958) 90 strips
 D050 X-S-S-16 (06/09/1958 – 09/13/1958) 84 strips
 D051 The Search for Doctor Eastland (09/15/1958 – 01/24/1959) 114 strips
 D052 Man on the Moon (01/26/1959 – 06/06/1959) 114 strips
 D053 The Sound (06/08/1959 – 09/19/1959) 90 strips
 D054 Mission to Maga (09/21/1959 – 01/23/1960) 108 strips
 D055 Steppingstone (01/25/1960 – 09/24/1960) 210 strips
 D056 Tattletale Tiros (09/26/1960 – 03/04/1961) 138 strips
 D057 Silent Search (03/06/1961 – 10/07/1961) 186 strips
 D058 Bradford's Bondage (10/09/1961 – 11/25/1961) 42 strips
 D059 Botanical Warfare (11/27/1961 – 04/28/1962) 132 strips
 D060 Adventure in the Aqua-Mole (04/30/1962 – 09/15/1962) 120 strips
 D061 The Proxima Centauri Run (09/17/1962 – 02/16/1963) 132 strips
 D062 Lady Loot (02/18/1963 – 05/18/1963) 78 strips
 D063 Adventure in Andromeda (05/20/1963 – 10/19/1963) 132 strips
 D064 Operation Chaos (10/21/1963 – 12/28/1963) 60 strips
 D065 Return to Panola (12/30/1963 – 05/16/1964) 120 strips
 D066 Cold Caper (05/18/1964 – 10/24/1964) 138 strips
 D067 Journey to Procyon (10/26/1964 – 01/23/1965) 78 strips
 D068 Saturn Sadie's Side Trip (01/25/1965 – 07/03/1965) 138 strips
 D069 Silverslinger (07/05/1965 – 10/23/1965) 96 strips
 D070 The Treasure of Toolee Tooee (10/25/1965 – 04/30/1966) 162 strips
 D071 The Agrarians (05/02/1966 – 08/27/1966) 102 strips
 D072 Strange Sargasso (08/29/1966 – 03/25/1967) 180 strips
 D073 Search for a Samaritan (03/27/1967 – 08/12/1967) 120 strips
 D074 Destination Laza (08/14/1967 – 09/23/1967) 36 strips
 D075 The Radiant Ruins of Ramdan (09/25/1967 – 05/04/1968) 192 strips
 D076 Ardun's Ark (05/06/1968 – 07/06/1968) 54 strips
 D077 Flight of Fantasy (07/08/1968 – 09/28/1968) 72 strips
 D078 Solitary Journey (09/30/1968 – 12/07/1968) 60 strips
 D079 Gathering on Gwaymus (12/09/1968 – 03/01/1969) 72 strips
 D080 The Evil Enkar (03/03/1969 – 05/03/1969) 54 strips
 D081 Galileo's Ghost (05/05/1969 – 07/26/1969) 72 strips
 D082 Revenge (07/28/1969 – 10/04/1969) 60 strips
 D083 Tabby's Tantrums (10/06/1969 – 12/13/1969) 60 strips
 D084 Return to Gwaymus (12/15/1969 – 03/14/1970) 78 strips
 D085 The Treasure of Tarabagara (03/16/1970 – 05/23/1970) 60 strips
 D086 Purple Pintar (05/25/1970 – 08/29/1970) 84 strips
 D087 Search for Urubu (08/31/1970 – 10/31/1970) 54 strips
 D088 Time and Trouble (11/02/1970 – 01/30/1971) 78 strips
 D089 Tenacious Tempo (02/01/1971 – 04/03/1971) 54 strips
 D090 Hoppy's Re-Migration (04/05/1971 – 06/12/1971) 60 strips
 D091 Tardy Tempo (06/14/1971 – 09/04/1971) 72 strips
 D092 Double Trouble (09/06/1971 – 11/13/1971) 60 strips
 D093 Stranded (11/15/1971 – 01/08/1972) 48 strips
 D094 Phoenix Fever (01/10/1972 – 04/08/1972) 78 strips
 D095 Going Home (04/10/1972 – 07/08/1972) 78 strips
 D096 Then There Were Two (07/10/1972 – 09/23/1972) 66 strips
 D097 Trail of the Tonabera (09/25/1972 – 12/02/1972) 60 strips
 D098 Polar Poltergeist (12/04/1972 – 03/03/1973) 78 strips
 D099 Long Way Home (03/05/1973 – 06/23/1973) 96 strips
 D100 A Change of Plans (06/25/1973 – 10/20/1973) 102 strips
 D101 A Flight of Ghosts (10/22/1973 – 12/08/1973) 42 strips
 D102 Old Masters (12/10/1973 – 02/16/1974) 60 strips
 D103 Cygnus Two (02/18/1974 – 04/27/1974) 60 strips
 D104 Lore (04/29/1974 – 08/03/1974) 84 strips
 D105 Search for Succor (08/05/1974 – 10/05/1974) 54 strips
 D106 Rescue (10/07/1974 – 12/28/1974) 72 strips
 D107 Stronger Force (12/30/1974 – 02/22/1975) 48 strips
 D108 Holiday on Hokuku! (02/24/1975 – 05/31/1975) 84 strips
 D109 Sea of Secrets (06/02/1975 – 08/16/1975) 66 strips
 D110 The Folly of Petro Leur (08/18/1975 – 12/27/1975) 114 strips
 D111 Lore Revisited (12/29/1975 – 02/14/1976) 42 strips
 D112 Beyond Bucala (02/16/1976 – 05/29/1976) 90 strips
 D113 The Way Home (05/31/1976 – 10/09/1976) 114 strips
 D114 Eye Spy (10/11/1976 – 01/29/1977) 96 strips
 D115 Rescue (01/31/1977 – 04/23/1977) 72 strips
 D116 Dead End (04/25/1977 – 08/27/1977) 108 strips
 D117 Lost (08/29/1977 – 01/07/1978) 114 strips
 D118 Dolphins of Dahgara (01/09/1978 – 04/22/1978) 90 strips
 D119 Wild Wet World (04/24/1978 – 08/05/1978) 90 strips
 D120 Space Trace (08/07/1978 – 12/16/1978) 114 strips
 D121 Emigres’ Reversion (12/18/1978 – 04/07/1979) 96 strips
 D122 Web of Life (04/09/1979 – 09/22/1979) 144 strips
 D123 Two, Too Many (09/24/1979 – 01/19/1980) 102 strips
 D124 Runagate (01/21/1980 – 06/07/1980) 120 strips
 D125 Loose Ends (06/09/1980 – 10/25/1980) 120 strips
 D126 Iona Incursion (10/27/1980 – 01/17/1981) 72 strips
 D127 Solar Power Play (01/19/1981 – 04/18/1981) 78 strips
 D128 Time Trials (04/20/1981 – 07/25/1981) 84 strips
 D129 The Realm of Ram (07/27/1981 – 01/02/1982) 138 strips
 D130 Jeopardy (01/04/1982 – 04/17/1982) 90 strips
 D131 Search for Saturn Sadie (04/19/1982 – 09/18/1982) 132 strips
 D132 Prekarius Plot (09/20/1982 – 04/16/1983) 180 strips
 D133 Topaz (04/18/1983 – 09/17/1983) 132 strips
 D134 Beyond the Limits (09/19/1983 – 12/31/1983) 90 strips
 D135 The Penny Black (01/02/1984 – 05/19/1984) 120 strips
 D136 Burawa Bondage (05/21/1984 – 08/03/1985) 378 strips
 D137 Aggression at Agwon (08/05/1985 – 12/21/1985) 120 strips
 D138 The Save of Saturn Sadie (12/23/1985 – 04/26/1986) 108 strips
 D139 What Next? (04/28/1986 – 07/26/1986) 78 strips
 D140 Mind Over Matter (07/28/1986 – 12/20/1986) 126 strips
 D141 Flight Tests (12/22/1986 – 04/25/1987) 108 strips

Sunday strips by Clarence Gray and William Ritt
 S001 The Land Of The Lost (11/25/1934 – 08/11/1935) 38 strips
 S002 In The Middle Of The Earth (08/18/1935 – 12/29/1935) 20 strips
 S003 Nameless Empire (In The Middle Of The Earth) (01/05/1936 – 08/09/1936) 32 strips
 S004 Forest Of Terror (In The Middle Of The Earth) (08/16/1936 – 10/11/1936) 9 strips
 S005 The Mayan Empire (In The Middle Of The Earth) (10/18/1936 – 01/31/1937) 16 strips
 S006 Land Of The Swan (In The Middle Of The Earth) (02/07/1937 – 10/10/1937) 36 strips
 S007 The Time Top (10/17/1937 – 12/05/1937) 8 strips
 S008 Travel Through Time (Traveller In Time) (12/12/1937 – 07/10/1938) 31 strips
 S009 Pirates Of The 17th Century (World Of 1685) (07/17/1938 – 02/05/1939) 30 strips
 S010 The Mummy (02/12/1939 – 11/12/1939) 40 strips
 S011 The Crown Of The Desert's Kings (11/19/1939 – 10/06/1940) 47 strips
 S012 On The Seas Of China (In China Seas) (10/13/1940 – 03/23/1941) 24 strips
 S013 The Southern Treasure (Martin Bloodstone) (03/30/1941 – 09/28/1941) 27 strips
 S014 Lost People (The Lost World) (10/05/1941 – 12/28/1941) 13 strips
 S015 Cities Of Future (Futura) (01/04/1942 – 10/11/1942) 41 strips
 S016 The Men Of The North (The Ice King) (10/18/1942 – 04/25/1943) 28 strips
 S017 Ultrasphere (05/02/1943 – 11/21/1943) 30 strips
 S018 The Thief Of Light (11/28/1943 – 08/27/1944) 40 strips
 S019 The Ageless Voice (09/03/1944 – 09/16/1945) 55 strips
 S020 The Third Millenium (Millennium Three) (09/23/1945 – 10/06/1946) 55 strips
 S021 Cities In The Precipice (The Cone Dwellers) (10/13/1946 – 01/05/1947) 13 strips
 S022 The Lord Of Doom (01/12/1947 – 08/10/1947) 31 strips
 S023 Birth Of a Legend (08/17/1947 – 10/26/1947) 11 strips
 S024 The Aztec Migration (The Aztec Ancestors) (11/02/1947 – 01/25/1948) 13 strips
 S025 Among The Incas (02/01/1948 – 09/19/1948) 34 strips
 S026 The Land Of The Unicorn (09/26/1948 – 10/23/1949) 57 strips
 S027 The Healing Ray (10/30/1949 – 01/01/1950) 10 strips
 S028 The Way Of Stars (In Quest Of Crystal Q) (01/08/1950 – 08/20/1950) 33 strips
 S029 Shada, Prince Of The Black Planet (08/27/1950 – 03/18/1951) 30 strips
 S030 The Metropolis In Space (Planet Platter) (03/25/1951 – 11/04/1951) 33 strips
 S031 The Wonderful Meteor (11/11/1951 – 06/08/1952) 31 strips
 S032 Coral Labyrinth (06/15/1952 – 02/01/1953) 34 strips
 S033 Sargasso of Space (02/08/1953 – 11/15/1953) 41 strips
 S034 Trespassing in Space (11/22/1953 – 07/11/1954) 34 strips
 S035 The Blue Interlude (New-Look Interlude) (07/18/1954 – 05/29/1955) 46 strips
 S036 Stay In Relaxa (Sojourn At Relaxa) (06/05/1955 – 02/19/1956) 38 strips
 S037 Recalled – Earth (Recall) (02/26/1956 – 05/13/1956) 12 strips           
 S038 World Of The Future (Quest Of Quentin Quado) (05/20/1956 – 04/21/1957) 50 strips

Sunday Strips by Paul Norris
 S039 The Return Of Brick Bradford (04/28/1957 – 11/10/1957) 28 strips
 S040 Travel In Space (11/17/1957 – 04/27/1958) 24 strips
 S041 Beyond The Stars (05/04/1958 – 10/12/1958) 24 strips
 S042 Iperspazio! (10/19/1958 – 03/29/1959) 24 strips
 S043 Forced Landing (04/05/1959 – 09/13/1959) 24 strips
 S044 Meteor Rain (09/20/1959 – 02/28/1960) 24 strips
 S045 A Castle Of Papers (03/06/1960 – 05/01/1960) 9 strips
 S046 The Indians Of The Space (05/08/1960 – 07/31/1960) 13 strips
 S047 The Father Of Saturn Sadie (08/07/1960 – 09/25/1960) 8 strips
 S048 One Undeclared Submarine War (10/02/1960 – 01/01/1961 14 strips
 S049 Saboteurs Of The Missile Bases (01/08/1961 –04/02/1961)
S050  The Search for Willa Ware (04/09/1961 to 06/18/1961)

 S051 to S101 with date in European format. 
S051 untitled                        25.06.1961 - 29.10.1961
S052 untitled                        05.11.1961 - 01.04.1962
S053 untitled                        08.04.1962 - 02.09.1962 
S054 The Venus Viking                09.09.1962 - 30.12.1962
S055 untitled                        06.01.1963 - 02.06.1963
S056 untitled                        09.06.1963 - 03.11.1963
S057 untitled                        10.11.1963 - 26.01.1964
S058 untitled                        02.02.1964 - 09.08.1964
S059 untitled                        16.08.1964 - 25.10.1964
S060 untitled                        01.11.1964 - 17.01.1965
S061 untitled                        24.01.1965 - 28.03.1965
S062 The Big Hunt                    04.04.1965 - 25.07.1965
S063 untitled                        01.08.1965 - 28.11.1965
S064 untitled                        05.12.1965 - 06.02.1966
S065 untitled                        13.02.1965 - 24.07.1966
S066 untitled                        31.07.1966 - 26.03.1967
S067 untitled                        02.04.1967 - 03.09.1967
S068 untitled                        10.09.1967 - 31.12.1967
S069 untitled                        07.01.1968 - 30.06.1968
S070 untitled                        07.07.1968 - 13.04.1969
S071 untitled                        20.04.1969 - 20.07.1969
S072 untitled                        27.07.1969 - 18.01.1970
S073 untitled                        25.01.1970 - 14.06.1970 
S074 untitled                        21.06.1970 - 30.08.1970
S075 untitled                        06.09.1970 - 28.02.1971
S076 untitled                        07.03.1971 - 16.05.1971
S077 untitled                        23.05.1971 - 25.07.1971
S078 The RHO IV                01.08.1971 - 03.10.1971
S079 The Strait of Sibod     10.10.1971 - 12.03.1972
S080 Silent Satellites          19.03.1972 - 11.06.1972
S081 Mission to Makahabe               18.06.1972 - 01.10.1972
S082 A New Order of Makahabe       08.10.1972 - 14.01.1973
S083 Stranded                     21.01.1973 - 29.04.1973
S084 Another World             06.05.1973 - 23.09.1973
S085 Journey to Jurisik        30.09.1973 - 09.12.1973
S086 Haloes                        16.12.1973 - 05.05.1974
S087 untitled                        12.05.1974 - 14.07.1974
S088 Earth Bound                21.07.1974 - 08.12.1974
S089 Lost                             15.12.1974 - 27.04.1975
S090 Strings Attached          04.05.1975 - 21.12.1975
S091 untitled                        28.12.1975 - 04.07.1976
S092 untitled                        11.07.1976 - 21.11.1976
S093 The Treasure of Tropoleetz       28.11.1976 - 03.04.1977
S094 The Botanist               10.04.1977 - 03.07.1977
S095 untitled                        10.07.1977 - 02.10.1977
S096 Power                          09.10.1977 - 15.01.1978
S097 Retaliation                   22.01.1978 - 07.05.1978
S098 Night Raiders              14.05.1978 - 12.11.1978
S099 Astral Armageddon     19.11.1978 - 18.02.1979
S100 Phool's Folly               25.02.1978 - 20.05.1979
S101 Trial of Tempo III         27.05.1979 - ??.??.1979

 Sundays end date : 09 May 1987 

ReprintsBrick Bradford was reprinted in comic-book form as King Features began to expand into that genre, including King Comics (published by David McKay Publications), starting from April 1936 (along with Barney Google, Henry, Popeye and Bringing Up Father among others), as well as in Ace Comics from 1947 to 1949. As the old comics were reprinted, a new series starring Brick was published by Standard Comics, but the series was soon canceled after 4 issues.Brick Bradford reappeared by 1966 in original comics published by King Comics. Brick Bradford stories appeared as back-up strips in The Phantom #26, 28 and Mandrake the Magician #5–7, 9, 10.

In the 1970s, the Pacific Comics Club reprinted several Brick Bradford stories in book form. Numerous Brick Bradford stories were reprinted in Italian and French booklets.

Collections of comic strip stories
 Brick Bradford in the Fortress of Fear: Daily Strips Jan. 8, 1938– Feb. 11, 1939. Club Anni Trenta, Genova, 1971, (English-language reprints).
 Brick Bradford : Voyage In A Coin by William Ritt and Clarence Gray. New York, NY : Comics Stars in the World & Pacific Comics Club, 1976. 
 Brick Bradford in the City Beneath the Sea by Ritt and Gray. Papeete-Tahiti (Polynesia), Pacific Comics Club, 1976.
 Brick Bradford in The Middle of the Earth by Ritt and Gray. Papeete-Tahiti (Polynesia), Pacific Comics Club, (J. Taoc), 1976.
 Brick Bradford with Brocco the Buccaneer by Ritt and Gray. Papeete-Tahiti (Polynesia), Pacific Comics Club, 1976. 
 Brick Bradford in The Land Of The Lost by Ritt &  Gray. Papeete-Tahiti (Polynesia) Pacific Comics Club, 1981.
 Brick Bradford and the Combustion Furnace: Daily Strips 2/8/1937-1/8/1938 by Ritt and Gray.  Toronto, Dragon Lady Press, Issue 5, 1987.
 Brick Bradford: Flight Tests by Paul Norris, in the Strip Adventure Special anthology, Forest Hills, N.Y. : JAL Publications, 1992.

 In other media
The strip also had a book series produced by Whitman Publishing's Big Little Books.Brick Bradford, a 15-chapter serial film starring Kane Richmond, was produced by Columbia Pictures in 1947.Brick Bradford was referenced in the 1965 The Dick Van Dyke Show episode "Uhny Uftz" when Rob believe he has seen a flying saucer with the "Brick Bradford insignia" on it, which he describes as being like a lightning bolt (in the actual comic strip Brick's insignia was a "B" in a circle).

Time Top sculpture
Before his death from cancer, Canadian artist Jerry Pethick (1935–2003) conceived a large bronze sculpture in the shape of the Time Top as depicted in later installments of Brick Bradford. In 2004, his widow, Margaret Pethick, took over the project. It was submerged in sea water for two years while connected to an electrical source to accelerate barnacle and mineral accretion on its surface for an aged look. In August 2006, the sculpture was installed on its permanent site at False Creek, Vancouver, British Columbia.Time Top sculpture description and photo at City of Vancouver site

References

Sources
Strickler, Dave. Syndicated Comic Strips and Artists, 1924–1995: The Complete Index.'' Cambria, CA: Comics Access, 1995. .

External links
Scoop: Brick Bradford
Brick Bradford at Don Markstein's Toonopedia. Archived from the original on February 22, 2018.
James Lileks

1933 comics debuts
1987 comics endings
Adventure comics
American comics adapted into films
American comics characters
American comic strips
Aviation comics
Comics about time travel
Comics characters introduced in 1933
Fictional aviators
Science fiction comic strips